Hořátev is a municipality and village in Nymburk District in the Central Bohemian Region of the Czech Republic. It has about 800 inhabitants.

History
The first written mention of Hořátev is from 1384.

References

Villages in Nymburk District